Ercheia styx is a species of moth of the family Erebidae. It is found on New Guinea.

References

Moths described in 1906
Ercheiini